Philippine "Pina" Bausch (27 July 1940 – 30 June 2009)  was a German dancer and choreographer who was a significant contributor to a neo-expressionist dance tradition now known as . Bausch's approach was noted for a stylized blend of dance movement, prominent sound design, and involved stage sets, as well as for engaging the dancers under her to help in the development of a piece, and her work had an influence on modern dance from the 1970s forward. Her work, regarded as a continuation of the European and American expressionist movements, incorporated many expressly dramatic elements and often explored themes connected to trauma, particularly trauma arising out of relationships. She created the company Tanztheater Wuppertal Pina Bausch, which performs internationally.

Early life 

Bausch was born in Solingen, the daughter of August and Anita Bausch, who owned a restaurant with guest rooms which is where she was born. The restaurant provided Pina with a venue to start performing at a very young age. She would perform for all of the guests in the hotel and occasionally go into their rooms and dance while they were trying to read the newspaper. It was then that her parents saw her potential.

Career 
Bausch was accepted into Kurt Jooss's the Folkwangschule at age of 14.

After graduation in 1959, Bausch left Germany with a scholarship from the German Academic Exchange Service to continue her studies at the Juilliard School in New York City in 1960, where her teachers included Antony Tudor, José Limón, Alfredo Corvino, and Paul Taylor. Bausch was very soon performing with Tudor at the Metropolitan Opera Ballet Company, and with Paul Taylor at New American Ballet. When, in 1960, Taylor was invited to premiere a new work named Tablet in Spoleto, Italy, he took Bausch with him. In New York Bausch also performed with the Paul Sanasardo and Donya Feuer Dance Company and collaborated on two pieces with them in 1961. It was in New York City that Pina stated, "New York is like a jungle but at the same time it gives you a feeling of total freedom. In these two years, I have found myself."

In 1962, Bausch joined Jooss' new  (Folkwang Ballet) as a soloist and assisted Jooss on many of the pieces. In 1968, she choreographed her first piece,  (Fragments), to music by Béla Bartók. In 1969, she succeeded Jooss as artistic director of the company.

Tanztheater Wuppertal Pina Bausch 

Josephine Ann Endicott was an Australian solo dancer before joining the Tanztheater. The company has a large repertoire of original pieces, and regularly tours throughout the world from its home base of the Opernhaus Wuppertal. It was renamed later: Tanztheater Wuppertal Pina Bausch.

Her best-known dance-theatre works include the melancholic Café Müller (1985), in which dancers stumble around the stage crashing into tables and chairs. Bausch had most of the dancers perform this piece with their eyes closed. The thrilling  (The Rite of Spring) (1975) required the stage to be completely covered with soil. She stated: "It is almost unimportant whether a work finds an understanding audience. One has to do it because one believes that it is the right thing to do. We are not only here to please, we cannot help challenging the spectator."

One of the themes in her work was relationships. She had a very specific process in which she went about creating emotions. "Improvisation and the memory of [the dancer's] own experiences ... she asks questions—about parents, childhood, feelings in specific situations, the use of objects, dislikes, injuries, aspirations. From the answers develop gestures, sentences, dialogues, little scenes." The dancer is free to choose any expressive mode, whether it is verbal or physical when answering these questions. It is with this freedom that the dancer feels secure in going deep within themselves. When talking about her process she stated, "There is no book. There is no set. There is no music. There is only life and us. It's absolutely frightening to do a work when you have nothing to hold on to." She stated, "In the end, it's composition. What you do with things. There's nothing there to start with. There are only answers: sentences, little scenes someone's shown you. It's all separate to start with. Then at a certain point I'll take something which I think is right and join it to something else. This with that, that with something else. One thing with various other things. And by the time I've found the next thing is right, then the little thing I had is already a lot bigger."

Male-female interaction is a theme found throughout her work, which has been an inspiration for—and reached a wider audience through—the movie Talk to Her, directed by Pedro Almodóvar. Her pieces are constructed of short units of dialogue and action, often of a surreal nature. Repetition is an important structuring device. She stated: "Repetition is not repetition, ... The same action makes you feel something completely different by the end."  Her large multi-media productions often involve elaborate sets and eclectic music. In , half of the stage is taken up by a giant, rocky hill, and the score includes everything from Portuguese music to k.d. lang.

In 1983, she played the role of La Principessa Lherimia in Federico Fellini's film And the Ship Sails On. The Tanztheater Wuppertal Pina Bausch made its American debut in Los Angeles as the opening performance of the 1984 Olympic Arts Festival.

In 2009, Bausch started to collaborate with film director Wim Wenders on a 3D documentary, Pina. The film premiered at the Berlin Film Festival in 2011.

Personal life 

Bausch was married to Dutch-born Rolf Borzik, a set and costume designer who died of leukaemia in 1980. Later that year, she met Ronald Kay, and in 1981 they had a son, Rolf Salomon Bausch.

Awards and honours 

Among the honours awarded to Bausch are the UK's Laurence Olivier Award and Japan's Kyoto Prize. She was awarded the Deutscher Tanzpreis in 1995. In 1999, she was the recipient of the Europe Theatre Prize. In 2008, the city of Frankfurt am Main awarded her its prestigious Goethe Prize. She was elected a Foreign Honorary Member of the American Academy of Arts and Sciences in 2009.

Works by Bausch were staged in June and July 2012 as a highlight of the Cultural Olympiad preceding the Olympic Games 2012 in London. The works were created when Bausch was invited to visit and stay in 10 global locations – in India, Brazil, Palermo, Hong Kong, Los Angeles, Budapest, Istanbul, Santiago, Rome, and Japan – between 1986 and 2009. Seven of the works have not been seen in the UK.

Europe Theatre Prize 
In 1999, she was awarded the VII Europe Theatre Prize, with the following motivation:Since she took over the direction of the Wuppertal Tanztheater 25 years ago, Pina Bausch has used her training and experience as a soloist in classical ballet to literally invent a new genre, a combination of theatre, dance, music, and visual arts in which score and improvisation come together, very close to the dream of a total theatre that juxtaposes the individual talents of an extraordinary ensemble with a precise concept of time and space. The results are deconstructions of Stravinsky or Bartok, reconstructions of Shakespeare or Brecht, or productions based on a theme - an anniversary, a dance, a farewell, a city - conceived as children's games or parlour games and orchestrated like review acts in order to rummage in the everyday life of the dancers, who pretend to have stopped dancing, subjected to public questioning and left to the flow of free associations, citing over and over but without ruling out psychoanalytical stripteases.

In these group productions, the great teacher Pina Bausch, who never forgets that she was once the blind princess in a visionary film by Fellini, forces her actors to assume a role and a type of ceremonial, where extremely varied personal experiences and backgrounds combine with the precise geometry of the rhythmic movements. Although the motifs change, from one animal or flower to another, each show extends into the next to become part of a hypothetical single continuum, in other words the rite of a show, the story of the community that performs it with the joy of disguise and the solitude of cohabitation. However, behind the often heartbreaking splendour of the visual tableaux, the seductive feline and ineluctable manner in which the troupe advances in single file, and the pattern of the movements, regular but cleverly out of tune, through this lifelong self-portrayal the great artist offers all her spectators an ironic and desperate mirror in which to reflect their existential condition.

Death 

Bausch died on 30 June 2009 in Wuppertal, North Rhine Westphalia, Germany at the age of 68 of an unstated form of cancer attributable to smoking, five days after diagnosis and two days before shooting was scheduled to begin for the long-planned Wim Wenders documentary. She is survived by her son Salomon.

Tributes

The same year, choreographer and experimental theatre-maker Dimitris Papaioannou created a piece called Nowhere to inaugurate the renovated Main Stage of the Greek National Theatre in Athens. The show's central and most prolific scene was dedicated to the memory of Pina Bausch and involved performers linking arms and stripping naked a man and woman.

In 2010 the dance company Les Ballets C de la B performed Out of Context – for Pina, which was dedicated to Bausch's memory. The show was directed and conceived by the company's founder Alain Platel, for whom Bausch was a friend and mentor.

In 2010 the choreographer Sidi Larbi Cherkaoui and dancer Shantala Shivalingappa premiered their work 'Play', which was dedicated to Pina Bausch's memory. Bausch was the main impetus for the piece as she had brought Cherkaoui and Shivalingappa to collaborate in 2008 to perform for the final edition of her festival.    

Wenders' documentary, Pina, was released in late 2011 in the United States, and is dedicated to her memory.

Influence on other artists 

Bausch's style has influenced performers such as David Bowie, who designed part of his 1987 Glass Spider Tour with Bausch in mind. For the tour, Bowie "wanted to bridge together some kind of symbolist theatre and modern dance" and used Bausch's early work as a guideline. Florence + The Machine's vocalist was also influenced by Bausch's work. She became very fond of Bausch's work and explained that her "work expresses the human condition in a way that I’ve never seen before—she’d do amazing pieces where it would just be a huge pile of rose petals that someone would ski down, or a dance that would be two people playing tag for two hours. It was incredibly visceral and emotional, and very experimental. So dancing for me is just a very calm place to be—you’re just with your body."

Influence on popular culture 

Promotional trailers for the third season of American Horror Story: Coven included a clip for the episode "Detention" and were likely influenced by Bausch's work . Stills from the performance and the episode show a group of women seemingly defying gravity as they cling to the walls high above the ground, toes pointed down and hands pressed above them. The photo of Bausch's performance was previously released on Reddit as well as Twitter with the implication that it was from a Russian mental institution, but its source was quickly identified.

Works 

The following table shows works since 1973. Several of Pina Bausch's works were announced as  because she chose a title late in the development of a work. The translations are given as on the website of Tanztheater Wuppertal Pina Bausch. Some of the German titles are ambiguous. "Kontakthof" is composed of Kontakt ("contact") and Hof ("court, courtyard"), resulting in "courtyard of contact," which is also a technical term for an area in some brothels where the first contact with prostitutes is possible. "Ich bring dich um die Ecke," literally "I'll take you around the corner," can mean "I'll accompany you around the corner" but also colloquially "I'll kill you." "Ahnen" can mean "ancestors," but also (as a verb) "to foresee", "bode", "suspect."

The details about the music for the works until 1986 follow a book by Raimund Hoghe who was dramaturge in Wuppertal.

Filmography 

 1980 Die Generalprobe. Documentary. Dir.: Werner Schroeter
 1983 What Are Pina Bausch and Her Dancers Doing in Wuppertal?. Documentary. Dir.: Klaus Wildenhahn
 1983 Plaisir du théâtre. TV mini-series documentary. Dir.: Georges Bensoussan
 1983 And the Ship Sails On. Drama. Dir.: Federico Fellini
 1983 Un jour Pina m'a demandé. TV documentary. Dir.: Chantal Akerman
 1990 The Complaint of an Empress. Dir.: Pina Bausch
 1990 3res 14torze 16tze. TV series. Episode dated 26 January 1990. Dir.: Cristina Ferrer
 1998 Lissabon Wuppertal Lisboa. TV documentary. Dir.: Fernando Lopes
 2002 Talk to Her. Drama. Dir.: Pedro Almodóvar
 2002 Pina Bausch – A Portrait by Peter Lindbergh based on 'Der Fensterputzer'. TV short. Dir.: Peter Lindbergh
 2004 La mandrágora. TV series. Dir.: Miguel Sarmiento
 2006 Pina Bausch. TV documentary. Dir.: Anne Linsel
 2010 Dancing Dreams. Documentary. Dir.: Rainer Hoffmann, Anne Linsel
 2011 Pina – Dance Dance Otherwise We Are Lost. Documentary. Dir.: Wim Wenders
 2011 Understanding Pina: The Legacy of Pina Bausch. Documentary. Dir.: Kathy Sullivan and Howard Silver

Gallery

Notes

References

Bibliography 

Books
 Gabriele Klein: Pina Bausch’s Dance Theater. Company, Artistic Practices and Reception. transcript, Bielefeld 2020, .
 
 
 
 
 Martinez, Alessandro (2002). Sur les traces de Pina-Tracing Pina's footsteps, (translation: Bachelier S., Devalier F., Garkisch C), ed. Premio Europa per il Teatro, 2002. .

Newspapers
 
 
 
 

Online sources

External links 

 Pina Bausch Foundation
 Tanztheater Wuppertal Pina Bausch
 Archival footage of Lutz Forster performing in Pina Bausch's For the Children of Yesterday, Today, and Tomorrow  in 2013 at Jacob’s Pillow Dance Festival.
 Archival footage of a complete performance ( 1989) of Pina Bausch's Palermo Palermo

Tributes
 The Guardian
 The Guardian
 The Guardian
 l'Humanité

Photography
 Dance photo, Mechthild Großmann by Peter Lind 1986
 Dance photo, Helena Pikon by Peter Lind 1986
 Dance photo, Jan Minarik & Dominique Mercy by Peter Lind 1986

1940 births
2009 deaths
Deaths from lung cancer in Germany
German female dancers
German women choreographers
Juilliard School alumni
Kyoto laureates in Arts and Philosophy
Modern dancers
People from Solingen
People from Wuppertal
Recipients of the Praemium Imperiale
Recipients of the Pour le Mérite (civil class)
Knights Commander of the Order of Merit of the Federal Republic of Germany
Fellows of the American Academy of Arts and Sciences
2012 Cultural Olympiad
Folkwang University of the Arts alumni